V M (Vicky) Brasseur is an author and public speaker advocating in the field of free and open-source software.

Career
Brasseur is the director of Open Source Strategy for Juniper Networks and former Vice President of the Open Source Initiative.

Brasseur is a frequent keynote speaker at tech conferences where she often discusses issues of community management and technological challenges in open source projects and environments, especially when they intersect with business environments.

Brasseur has written many articles for publications including Linux Journal and opensource.com, for which she has also been a moderator. Her 2018 book Forge Your Future with Open Source aimed to help newcomers get started in participating in the open source software community. The book was listed number 11 in BookAuthority's 21 Best New Software Development Books To Read In 2019.

Awards
Brasseur is the winner of the Perl White Camel Award in 2014 and the O'Reilly Open Source Award in 2016. She won an Opensource.com Moderator's Choice Award in 2018 and in 2019.

References

Work

External links
 Personal website
 

Open source people
Living people
O'Reilly writers
Year of birth missing (living people)